Dimitris Giannoulis (Greek: Δημήτρης Γιαννούλης, born 4 May 1987) also known by his stage name Snik (stylized as SNIK) is a Greek rapper.

Career
In 2012 Giannoulis released his first single "Thema Chronou" which reached 100,000 views on YouTube. He subsequently signed a contract with the Panik Records label. He released the first two songs on the label: "Kounisou Dipla Mou" and "Ti Zoi Mou Grafo" (with DJ Young). During this time, SNIK gained significant exposure on the internet, with many critics judging his songs negatively.

In 2015, he returned with his new single "Tony Montana" in collaboration with the rapper Light, with whom he also collaborated on the songs "Gucci Mane", "Gia Panta" and "bosses". Giannoulis stated that "Tony Montana" is his favorite song from his discography. In this period of his career, Giannoulis released the singles; "Ferrari", "Harry Houdini" and "DAB", in a collaboration with the rapper Ypo. Subsequently, he released five new songs in Greece and Cyprus, these are; "Ath", "9", "Gangsta", "Gango", "Medusa "Senorita'. The last song remains his most popular song on YouTube, having collected more than 35 million views, as of April 2021.

Giannoulis performed the song "To Gucci Forema" with Giorgos Mazonakis on Mad VMA 2018. In 2019, his song "Colpo Grosso" reached number 1 in Greece, Cyprus, Italy, Albania, and number 10 in Switzerland. In 2020, he released his debut album "Topboy" which charted at number 1 on Greek Spotify charts. Before the release of the Topboy album he announced that he has a second album finished.

Discography

Singles

 Thema chronou (2012) ft. Bret
 Kounisou dipla mou (2012)
 Ola allazoun (2013) ft. Josephine
 Epistrofi sto mellon (2013)
 Ti zoi mou grafo (2013) ft. DJ YOUNG
 So fly (2013)
 Booty (2015) ft. Diamond
 Tony Montana (2015) ft. Light
 Gucci Mane (2015) ft. Light
 Gia panta (2016) ft. Light
 Ferrari (2016)
 DAB (2016) ft. Ypo
 Harry Houdini (2017) ft. A.M. SNiPER
 E.S.M., Pt. 2 (2017)
 Gucci store (2017)
 Selfmade (2017)
 Cognac & Valeriana (2017)
 Ath (2017) ft. Mente Fuerte
 9 (2017)
 Sou eipa tha anevo (2018)
 Medusa (2018)
 211 (2018) ft. Mente Fuerte
 To Gucci forema (2018) ft. Giorgos Mazonakis
 Gangsta (2018) ft. A.M. SNiPER
 Gango (2018) ft. Noizy
 Monos mou (2019)
 New Benz (2019) ft. Noizy
 Kilo (2019)
 Senorita (2019) ft. Tamta
 Colpo Grosso (2019) ft. Capo Plaza, Noizy & Gue Pequeno

Awards

MAD Video Music Awards

References

1989 births
Living people
21st-century Greek male singers
Greek rappers